Captain Blair Onslow Cochrane  (11 September 1853 –7 December  1928) was a British sailor who competed in the 1908 Summer Olympics. He was helmsman of the British boat Cobweb, which won the gold medal in the 8-metre class.

Cochrane was born near Darlington, County Durham, the son of a wealthy land and coal mine owner. His great-grandfather was  Archibald Cochrane, 9th Earl of Dundonald. He was educated at King's College School and the Royal Military Academy, Woolwich. He joined the Royal Horse Artillery and rose to the rank of captain.

In 1896, Cochrane, Lieutenant-Colonel Augustus Henry Macdonald Moreton, and Captain Ernest du Boulay instigated the Bembridge Redwing Class the earliest one design keelboat class with a One Design hull and restricted development rig.

In the 1908 Olympic Games, Cochrane and his brothers-in-law, Henry Sutton and John Rhodes, raced in Cochrane's yacht, Cobweb, that won the 8-metre class.

From 1909 to 1913, Cochrane was Rear Commodore of the Royal Victoria Yacht Club. He was also a member of Bembridge Sailing Club <ref>

He later served as  County Director, Auxiliary Hospitals and Voluntary Aid Detachments on the Isle of Wight. He was appointed an Officer of the Order of the British Empire in the 1919 New Year Honours for his service during the First World War.

He married Mary Sutton, daughter of Sir Richard Sutton, 4th Baronet. Their daughter, Jean Cochrane, was also a top yachtswoman. She died unexpectedly on her yacht in 1946.

References

External links
Profile at sports-reference.com

1853 births
1928 deaths
British male sailors (sport)
Sailors at the 1908 Summer Olympics – 8 Metre
Olympic sailors of Great Britain
Olympic gold medallists for Great Britain
Olympic medalists in sailing
Officers of the Order of the British Empire
People educated at King's College School, London
Graduates of the Royal Military Academy, Woolwich
English people of Scottish descent
Medalists at the 1908 Summer Olympics